The following is a listing of the Original Ontario Provincial Junior A Hockey League's Standings. The OPJHL was founded in 1972.

The OPJHL changed its name to the Ontario Hockey Association Junior A Hockey League to better show its affiliation to the Ontario Hockey Association in 1981. The OPJHL was created to compete with the Southern Ontario Junior A Hockey League.

Related Articles:
List of OJHL Standings (1981-1987)
List of OPJHL Standings (1993-Present)

Note: GP - Games Played, W - Wins, L - Losses, T - Ties, OTL - Overtime Losses, GF - Goals For, GA - Goals Against, P - Points.

1972–73
The Wexford Raiders won the 1973 Buckland Trophy as OPJHL Champions.

Playoffs
OHA Championship
Chatham Maroons defeated Wexford Raiders 4-games-to-3

1973–74
The Wexford Raiders won the 1974 Buckland Trophy as OPJHL Champions..

Playoffs
OHA Championship
Wexford Raiders defeated Windsor Spitfires 4-games-to-3

1974–75
The Toronto Nationals won the 1975 Buckland Trophy as OPJHL Champions..

Playoffs
OHA Championship
Guelph CMC's defeated Toronto Nationals 4-games-to-2

1975–76
The North Bay Trappers won the 1976 Buckland Trophy as OPJHL Champions.

Playoffs
OHA Championship
Guelph Platers defeated North Bay Trappers 4-games-to-1

1976–77
The North York Rangers won the 1977 Buckland Trophy as OPJHL Champions..

Playoffs
OHA Championship
North York Rangers defeated Guelph Platers 4-games-to-3

1977–78
The Guelph Platers won the 1978 Buckland Trophy as OPJHL Champions, the Dudley Hewitt Cup as Central Canadian Champions, and the Manitoba Centennial Cup as National Junior A Champions.

Playoffs
Final
Guelph Platers defeated Royal York Royals 4-games-to-1

1978–79
The Guelph Platers won the 1979 Buckland Trophy as OPJHL Champions and the Dudley Hewitt Cup as Central Canadian Champions.

Playoffs
OHA Championship
Guelph Platers defeated Dixie Beehives 4-games-to-1

1979–80
The North York Rangers won the 1980 Buckland Trophy as OPJHL Champions and the Dudley Hewitt Cup as Central Canadian Champions.

Playoffs
OHA Championship
North York Rangers defeated Onaping Falls Huskies 3-games-to-none

1980–81
The Belleville Bulls won the 1981 Buckland Trophy as OPJHL Champions and the Dudley Hewitt Cup as Central Canadian Champions.

Playoffs
OHA Championship
Belleville Bulls defeated Onaping Falls Huskies 3-games-to-none

Ontario Provincial Junior A Hockey League